Stuart Tayler Smith (born 1963) is a New Zealand National Party politician who has been a member of the House of Representatives for the Kaikōura electorate since the 2014 general election. Before entering parliament he was a Marlborough grape grower and chairman of the New Zealand Winegrowers Association.

Political career

Fifth National Government (2014–2017)
In 2013 Smith contested the National Party selection for the Kaikōura seat, defeating incumbent Colin King. He was elected at the 2014 election with a majority of 12,570 votes. During the 2014–17 Parliamentary term, Smith served as Deputy Chair of the Primary Production Committee and the Social Services Committee.

Sixth Labour Government (2017–present)
During the 2017 New Zealand general election, Smith retained Kaikōura for the National Party, defeating Labour candidate Janette Walker by slightly reduced majority of 10,553 votes. Following the formation of the Labour-NZ First-Greens coalition minority government after the election, the National party returned to Opposition, with outgoing Prime Minister Bill English becoming Leader of the Opposition. English ranked Smith at 46th in his new shadow cabinet, the lowest ranked of any MP elected prior to the 2017 election. He was also appointed as National's spokesperson for Civil Defense and the Earthquake Commission.

Following English's resignation in early 2018, Simon Bridges was elected party leader, and Smith was given a significant promotion. Moving up in the National rankings and taking on the Viticulture portfolio while retaining his previous Civil Defense and Earthquake Commission spokesperson roles. In 2019 Bridges promoted Smith to 27th in caucus and appointed him to the Immigration portfolio. After Todd Muller was elected National leader in May 2020, Smith was demoted one place in the National rankings to 28th and dropping his Civil Defense and Earthquake portfolios while retaining his Viticulture and Immigration spokespersonships.

During the 2020 New Zealand general election, Smith retained Kaikōura, defeating Labour candidate Matt Flight by a significantly reduced majority of 2,295 votes, reflecting the nationwide landslide towards the Labour party.

References

Living people
New Zealand National Party MPs
Members of the New Zealand House of Representatives
New Zealand MPs for South Island electorates
21st-century New Zealand politicians
Candidates in the 2017 New Zealand general election
1963 births